Oswald Charles Eugène Marie Ghislain de Kerchove de Denterghem (1 April 1844 – 20 March 1906),  was a Belgian liberal politician. Oswald de Kerchove was a son of the Ghentian mayor Charles de Kerchove de Denterghem.
De Kerchove was a lawyer and became a liberal senator. He was governor in Hainaut from  1878 to  1884. 
He was an internationally recognized authority in the study of palms and orchids.

Bibliography 
 Oswald de Kerchove de Denterghem, Les palmiers histoire iconographinque, Paris, published by J. Rothschild, 1878.
 Oswald de Kerchove de Denterghem, Le Livre des Orchidées, 1894.

References

External links

1844 births
1906 deaths
Governors of Hainaut (province)
Belgian naturalists
Flemish nobility
19th-century Belgian scientists